These are the late night Monday-Friday schedules on all three networks for each calendar season beginning September 1961. All times are Eastern and Pacific.

Talk shows are highlighted in yellow, local programming is white.

Schedule

Note: After Jack Paar's departure on March 29, 1962, guest hosts filled in on The Tonight Show until Johnny Carson's ABC contract ended in September, then he took over as permanent host.

By network

ABC

New Series
ABC News Final

NBC

Returning Series
The Jack Paar Show
The Best Of Paar

New Series
The Tonight Show *

United States late night network television schedules
1961 in American television
1962 in American television